Philipp Klingmann (born 22 August 1988) is a German professional footballer who plays as a right-back. He is currently without a club.

References

External links
 
 

Living people
1988 births
Association football fullbacks
German footballers
TSG 1899 Hoffenheim II players
Karlsruher SC players
SV Sandhausen players
2. Bundesliga players
3. Liga players
Sportspeople from Heidelberg
Footballers from Baden-Württemberg